Samuel Deguara is a Maltese professional basketball player for Tainan TSG GhostHawks of the T1 League. He is the tallest man in Italy and Malta.

Professional career

Beginnings in Italy
Deguara began his professional career after signing a nine-year contract with Benetton Treviso, breaking through the club's youth ranks. After three years, Deguara was loaned to fellow Italian sides BVO Caorle and CUS Bari Pallacanestro over the course of the next two years. The following season, he played for Pallacanestro Reggiana in the Serie A, playing a single game against Armani Milano.

Malta
After an injury-plagued spell in Italy, Deguara decided to return to his native Malta, signing up for BUPA Luxol for the 2013–2014 season. It was a successful stint for Deguara, where he averaged 29.5 points and 21.4 rebounds per game there.

Spain
After his stint in his native country, Deguara set out to Spain to continue his basketball career. He first played for Viten Getafe, scoring 5 points and 6 rebounds in 10 minutes of action. After Getafe, Deguara continued his stint in Spain, playing for Fuenlabrada and also for its reserve team. Deguara also played for Ferrol, where he tallied 17 points, 17 rebounds and 3 blocks in his debut and averaged 15.0 points and 11.0 rebounds a game.

North America
Deguara continued his basketball career in America, where he was selected 98th overall in the sixth round by the Erie Bayhawks in the 2015 NBA Development League Draft. However, Deguara did not play a single game for the BayHawks.

Deguara was then signed by newly-formed NBL Canada side Niagara River Lions. Despite his much-publicized and highly hyped signing with the Canadian club, he was largely absent from the team's debut campaign in the NBLC, playing in only 3 games, playing a total of 7 minutes and scoring only 2 points in all games.

Lithuania
Deguara signed a contract with Lithuanian side BC Šilutė, playing in the Lithuanian second tier, the NKL.

Return to Malta
Deguara returned to his native Malta for the second time, again playing for BUPA Luxol, where he led the club to its 13th Maltese championship, where they swept fellow Maltese club Floriana MCP Car Parks in a best-of-five series.

Southeast Asia
Deguara headed to Asia for the first time in his career, where he signed with Malaysian NBL side Farmcochem, winning the Malaysia Pro League title in his only season with the club, scoring 24 points and 24 rebounds in the championship game against the KL Dragons.

Shortly after his stint in Malaysia, Deguara was signed by another Southeast Asian club, PEA, of Thailand.

In January 2018, Deguara was signed by another Thai club and ASEAN Basketball League side Mono Vampire, where he replaced Reggie Johnson, who left the team due to personal reasons.

Deguara returned to the Southeast Asian league with San Miguel Alab Pilipinas, replacing Adrian Forbes as the team's third import.

Taiwan
On March 21, 2022, Deguara signed with the TaiwanBeer HeroBears of the T1 League. On August 9, 2022, Deguara signed with the Tainan TSG GhostHawks of the T1 League.

National team career
Deguara is the tallest player on the Malta national basketball team, and has been in the national set-up since he was 14. Deguara was also part of the Malta national team that won the Division C of the FIBA Europe Under-18 Championship on home soil in 2009, where he averaged 27.2 points and 23.8 rebounds per game. Deguara also played for the medal-winning teams of Malta that took part in the 2010, 2012 and 2014 European Championships for Small Countries, winning bronze, another bronze and silver medals, respectively, in these events.

In 2018, he helped Malta to win the tournament and achieved the MVP title. He accomplished this all while not starting a single game in the tournament.

Playing style
Despite his imposing stature and immense size, he is considered a good rebounder and an effective passer from the post.

Personal life
Deguara wears US size 24 (43 cm) shoes (size 60 EU). Deguara is multilingual, speaking Italian, English, and Maltese fluently.

References

Living people
1991 births
Centers (basketball)
Eastern Sports Club basketball players
Maltese expatriate sportspeople in Italy
Maltese expatriates in Thailand
Maltese expatriate sportspeople in the United States
Maltese men's basketball players
Naturalised citizens of Italy
Niagara River Lions players
San Miguel Alab Pilipinas players
Italian expatriate basketball people in the Philippines
Maltese expatriate basketball people in the Philippines
Expatriate basketball people in Taiwan
Italian expatriate sportspeople in Taiwan
Taipei Fubon Braves players
TaiwanBeer HeroBears players
T1 League imports
Tainan TSG GhostHawks players
P. League+ imports